Lunel-Viel is a railway station in Lunel-Viel, Occitanie, southern France. Within TER Occitanie, it is part of line 21 (Narbonne–Avignon).

References

Railway stations in Hérault